Pilot to Gunner is an American indie/post-punk revival band, which came together in New York City around 1998. Led by the vocals and guitar of Scott V. Padden, Pilot to Gunner also includes guitarist Patrick Hegarty, bassist Martin McLoughlin, and drummer Kurt L. Herrman. The boys debuted on wax in 1999 with the Hit the Ground and Hum EP for "Me Too!"; that led to the 2001 Gern Blandsten full-length Games at High Speeds. A deal with the Arena Rock Recording Co., which reissued Games at High Speeds with an additional bonus track in early 2003.  Games at High Speeds was also picked up by Rykodisc in Europe, and Building Records in Australia.  Get Saved was recorded in 2003 with J. Robbins and released in 2004 by ARRCO in the US, Rykodisc in Europe, and Building Records in Australia.
 
The band's third album Guilty Guilty was released in 2012.

Members

Current
 Scott V. Padden - lead vocals (1998-present)
 Patrick Hegarty - guitar (1998-present)
 Martin McLoughlin - bass guitar (1998-present)
 Kurt L. Herrmann - drums (1998-present)

Discography

Studio albums
Games at High Speeds (2001)
Get Saved (2004)
Guilty Guilty (2012)
Hail Hallucinator (2022)

EPs
Hit the Ground and Hum (2000)

Non-album songs 
• 68 - Released on Until the Shaking Stops - A Salute to Jawbox

Appearances 
The song Barrio Superstarrio was featured on Rockstar game Midnight Club 3

External links 
 Pilot to Gunner on MySpace.com
 Pilot to Gunner at Arena Rock Recording Co.

Arena Rock Recording Company artists
Indie rock musical groups from New York (state)
Musical groups from New York City